The National Algae Association is a United States non-profit algae production trade organization for commercially minded algae researchers, algae producers and equipment companies.

Created in January 2008 and headquartered in Houston, Texas, the association seeks to co-ordinate research and development efforts for commercial algal fuel applications. It also hosts conferences for the presentation of scientific papers on algal fuel.

See also 
Algae fuel in the United States

References

External links
National Algae Association

Trade associations based in the United States
Renewable energy in the United States
Energy business associations